The State University of New York College of Agriculture and Technology at Cobleskill (SUNY Cobleskill) is a public college in Cobleskill, New York.  It is part of the State University of New York (SUNY) system. It began as the Schoharie State School of Agriculture in 1911 and joined the SUNY system in 1916. SUNY Cobleskill is accredited by the Middle States Commission on Higher Education and the New York State Education Department registers all academic programs.

Campus facilities

Residence halls

SUNY Cobleskill has 10 residence halls for full-time students. All student rooms are wired for cable television and Wireless Internet access.

First Year Experience — only first-year students.
 Fake Hall
 Parsons Hall
 Ten Eyck Hall
 Davis Hall
Cobleskill Traditional - Permitting all students regardless of year.
 Dix Hall
 Draper Hall
 Pearson Hall
Upper Class Living/Learning - Permitting any student with 60 or more credits completed.
 Vroman Hall
Single Gender - Segregating the residents by wing, one is female, the other is male. Each wing has one or two common, single gender bathrooms.
 Wieting Hall
Suite style and townhouse living - Students each live in their own room and share a living space, kitchen and bathroom with other students in their suite or town home. Suites have 4 rooms per living area and townhouses have 6 and are also equipped with a washer and dryer.
Alumni Commons

Academic buildings
The academic buildings are spread out across the campus. The major buildings include:

 The Old Quad complex, located on the original college site, includes: Frisbie, Home Economics, Old Gym, and Alumni Halls.
 The Agricultural complex, including: Curtis Mott (Ag Eng), Center for Agriculture and Natural resources CANR (houses plant science, animal science and wildlife classes/labs), Livestock facilities, Dairy Barn, Equestrian Center, Fish Hatchery, Greenhouses, Horse Barn, Livestock Building, Meat Processing Lab, and the Nursery.
 Warner: The Business and Computer technologies building.
 Wheeler: The Liberal Arts and Sciences building.
 Champlin and Prentice Halls: Culinary Arts, Hospitality & Tourism buildings,
 Holmes Hall: the Early Childhood building.
 The Childcare Center
 Van Wagenen Library

Dining facilities
The Dining Services are run by the Cobleskill Auxiliary Services (CAS) and are various. With their ID card, students may use their meal plan, a CobyCash account, or opt to pay in cash.

 Brickyard Brewhouse: Specialty Coffees, Smoothies, Bottled Beverages and Fresh Made Pastries. Plus wifi access in our e-cafe.
 CANR farm fresh cafe, in CANR building, a grab and go breakfast station with made-to-order specialty salads.
 Champlin Hall: All-you-care-to-eat, dine-in facility with hot bar, cook-to-order, deli, salad bar, burgers, hot dogs, fries and special dinners.
 Prentice Cafe: Prentice Hall, a dine in or take out made-to-order facility with pasta station, Mongolian grill, grilled cheese and quesadillas.
 Twisted Whiskers: Bouck Hall, a build-your-own sub and/or salad, and soup shop.
 Warner Cafe: Warner Hall a grab and go facility with breakfast, sandwiches, soup, coffee and snacks.

Athletic facilities
 Baseball Field
 Bouck Pool, 25 yards, 6 lanes
 Running Track
 Soccer Field
 Softball Field
 Fitness Center
 Tennis Courts
 The Fieldhouse
 The Iorio Gymnasium

Other facilities
 Bouck Hall, the Student Activities Building, which is home to the Ioro Gymnasium, the fitness center, the Bouck Auditorium, the Campus bowling alley, the Bouck swimming pool, the college store, the mail room, the Student Life Center, Twisted Whiskers sandwich shop, The Commuter Lounge, and the Bouck Ballroom.
 Johnson Hall, home to University Police.
 Knapp Hall, the Administration Building; home to the Career Development Center, Residential Life, Student Accounts, Admissions, Financial Aid, the Registrar's office, and telecommunications.
 The Wellness Center offers both medical support, and counseling.
Brick yard point, houses Brew house cafe and hosts student recreational activities

Athletics
SUNY Cobleskill teams participate as a member of the National Collegiate Athletic Association's Division III, after spending years in the National Junior College Athletic Association (NJCAA). The Fighting Tigers are primarily a member of the North Atlantic Conference (NAC) for all sports since the 2020-21 season, with the exception of equestrian which competes in the Intercollegiate Horse Show Association (IHSA) and track & field which competes in the New York State College Track Conference (NYSCTC). The Fighting Tigers were also formerly a member of the North Eastern Athletic Conference (NEAC) from 2008-09 to 2019-20. Men's sports include: basketball, cross country, equestrian, golf, lacrosse, soccer, swimming & diving, and track & field; while women's sports include: basketball, cross country, equestrian, golf, lacrosse (in 2023–24), soccer, softball, swimming & diving, track & field, and volleyball.

Notable alumni
 Pete Dominick, Comedian
 Peter Lopez (R), 127th New York Assemblyman (2006–2017)

References

External links
 Official website

 
Education in Schoharie County, New York
Buildings and structures in Schoharie County, New York
Educational institutions established in 1911
1911 establishments in New York (state)
Public universities and colleges in New York (state)